Pierrick is a given name. Notable people with the name include:

Pierrick Bourgeat (born 1976), French alpine skier
Pierrick Capelle (born 1987), French professional footballer
Pierrick Cros (footballer, born 1991) (born 1991), French football player
Pierrick Cros (footballer, born 1992) (born 1992), French football player
Pierrick Fédrigo (born 1978), French racing cyclist
Pierrick Gunther (born 1989), French rugby player
Pierrick Hiard (born 1955), French retired footballer
Pierrick Lebourg (born 1989), French professional footballer
Pierrick Lilliu (born 1986), French rock-singer
Pierrick Rakotoharisoa (born 1991), French football player of Malagasy descent
Pierrick Valdivia (born 1988), French footballer

See also
Pierric

French masculine given names